Cranmore may refer to:

 Cranmore, Somerset, a village in England
 Cranmore railway station, the main railway station on the East Somerset Railway
 Cranmore, Isle of Wight, a village on the Isle of Wight, England
 Cranmore Mountain Resort, a ski resort in North Conway, New Hampshire, USA
 Cranmore, Sligo, a large local authority housing development in Ireland